Georges Estrel Rasetti (25 May 1889 – 6 November 1957), who sometimes signed his paintings as Estrel, was a French painter and sculptor. He was the son of painter and ceramicist, Georges Joseph Rasetti (1851 – 1938).

Biography
Georges Estrel Rasetti's work was part of the painting event in the art competition at the 1928 Summer Olympics in Amsterdam, The Netherlands. His painting was an oil on canvas painting called Cross-country that was 80 x 117 cm.

This international multi-sport event was celebrated from 28 July to 12 August 1928. In addition to sports, the Olympic Games at that time also included art competitions in five categories: architecture, painting, sculpture, literature, and poetry.

In addition, Rasetti participated in the painting event in the art competition at the 1924 Summer Olympics in Paris, France.

Personal life
Georges Estrel Rasetti was the son of painter and ceramicist, Georges Joseph Rasetti (1851 - 1938). His mother, wife of Georges Joseph Rasetti, was Céline Constance Alexandrone Chaudet (15 April 1863 – 5 May 1941).

Céline Chaudet's brother, Georges Alfred Chaudet, was a painter, photographer and art dealer for Paul Gauguin. Georges Chaudet died in 1899. Georges Chaudet was a member of the Société des Artistes Français, with whom he exhibited. Georges Chaudet met Gauguin in the Breton village of Douarnenez, in Brittany, France, and became Gauguin's friend and art dealer until Chaudet's death.

References

1889 births
1957 deaths
19th-century French painters
20th-century French painters
20th-century French male artists
French male painters
Olympic competitors in art competitions
Painters from Paris
19th-century French male artists